is the Internet country code top-level domain (ccTLD) for Poland, administered by NASK, the Polish research and development organization. It is one of the founding members of CENTR.

History 
The  domain was created in 1990, following the mitigation of the COCOM embargo on technological collaboration with post-communist countries.

In 2008 the number of registered .pl domain names exceeded one million, whereas at the end of 2013 the registry comprised more than 2.4 million domain names.

Each domain must be registered in the National Domain Name Registry.

Second-level domains 
Several functional and regional domain endings exist. Most popular are:

Functional domains
 , : commercial entities
 : network infrastructure
 : art
 : education
 : government
 : (general) information
 : military
 : NGOs and not-for-profit organizations

Regional domains
There are 118 regional domain endings in the  zone. Some of them are:
 : Białystok (city)
 : Częstochowa (city)
 , : Gdańsk (city)
 : Gorzów Wielkopolski (city)
 : Katowice (city)
 : Kraków (city)
 : Lublin (city)
 : Małopolska (region)
 : Olsztyn (city)
 : Poznań (city)
 : Rzeszów (city)
 : Szczecin (city)
 : Śląsk (region)
 : Toruń (city)
 , : Wrocław (city)
 , : Warsaw (city)
 : Zielona Góra (city)

References

External links 
 IANA  whois information
 Domain name registry of 
 Statistics of 
 List of accredited Registrars

 IDN registration policy in 

Country code top-level domains
Internet in Poland
Council of European National Top Level Domain Registries members

sv:Toppdomän#P